Mary Ann Morrissey (born March 26, 1957) is a Republican politician who was elected and currently serves in the Vermont House of Representatives. She represents the Bennington-2-2 Representative District.

References

External links
Profile at Vote Smart

1957 births
Living people
Republican Party members of the Vermont House of Representatives
Women state legislators in Vermont
21st-century American politicians
21st-century American women politicians
20th-century American politicians
20th-century American women politicians